Myrmecocephalus is a genus of beetles belonging to the family Staphylinidae.

The species of this genus are found in Europe, Japan, Australia and Northern America.

Species:
 Myrmecocephalus alluaudi (Fauvel, 1907) 
 Myrmecocephalus alutipennis (Cameron, 1939)

References

Staphylinidae
Staphylinidae genera